Boppeus lagrioides is a species of beetle in the family Cerambycidae. It was described by Villiers in 1982.

References

Dorcasominae
Beetles described in 1982